Tamil Brahmins are an ethnoreligious community of Tamil-speaking Hindu Brahmins, predominantly living in Tamil Nadu, though they number significantly in Telangana, Andhra Pradesh, Kerala, Karnataka, in addition to other regions of India, as well as Sri Lanka. They can be broadly divided into two denominations: Iyengars, who are adherents of Sri Vaishnavism, and Iyers, who follow the Srauta and Smarta traditions.

Denominations
Tamil Brahmins are divided into two major denominations: Iyers, who follow the Smartha tradition, and Iyengars, who adhere to the tradition of Sri Vaishnavism.

Iyer 

Iyers are Srauta-Smartha Brahmins, whose members follow the Advaita philosophy propounded by Adi Shankara. They are concentrated mainly along the Cauvery Delta districts of Nagapattinam, Thanjavur, Tiruvarur and Tiruchirapalli where they form almost 10% of the total population. However the largest population reside in Nagercoil, making up to 13% of the city's population. They are also found in significant numbers in Chennai, Coimbatore, Madurai, Thiruchirappalli, Thanjavur, Palakkad, Alappuzha, Kozhikode, Ernakulam, Kannur, and Thiruvananthapuram.

Iyengar 

The Iyengars subscribe to the Visishtadvaita philosophy propounded by Ramanuja. They are divided into two denominations: Vadakalai (Northern art) and Tenkalai (Southern art), each with minor differences in religious rites and traditions. They adhere to the tradition of Sri Vaishnavism.

Adi Saivas/Gurukkal 
Brahmins who serve as priests in temples following the Vaishnavite and Shaivite tradition and perform pujas are sometimes offered a distinct category within the community. These priests are called "Bhattar" in the Vaishnavite tradition and in the Pandya regions of Tamil Nadu, and "Gurukkal" in the shaivite tradition and in northern ones. In Kongu Nadu, they are called Adi Saivas or the Sivacharyas. They follow the Agamas and the Vedas.

Notable people 

 Sage Agastya, revered Indian sage of Hinduism, Tamil Siddhar in the Shaivism tradition, and author of Agattiyam, an early grammar of the Tamil language
 Viswanathan Anand, Indian Chess Grandmaster
 Rukmini Devi Arundale, Indian classical Bharatanatyam dancer, theosophist, choreographer and an activist for animal welfare
 Ravichandran Ashwin, Indian cricketer
 K. Balachander, Indian filmmaker and playwright
 Maadhu Balaji, Indian actor
 S. Jaishankar, Indian diplomat and politician serving as the Minister of External Affairs of the Government of India since 30 May 2019
 Subramania Bharati, Indian independence activist and poet
 Subrahmanyan Chandrasekhar, Nobel Prize-winning Indian astrophysicist
 Seetha Doraiswamy, Indian carnatic multi-instrumentalist
 Gemini Ganesan, Indian actor
 Shyamala Gopalan, American-Indian biomedical scientist, Mother of U.S. Vice President Kamala Harris
 Kamal Haasan, Indian actor
 Alladi Krishnaswamy Iyer, Indian lawyer and member of the Constituent Assembly of India responsible for framing the Constitution of India
 Janani Iyer, Indian actress
 Semmangudi Srinivasa Iyer, Indian Carnatic vocalist
 Shreyas Iyer, Indian cricketer
 Tirukkodikaval Krishna Iyer, Indian carnatic violinist 
 U. V. Swaminatha Iyer, Indian researcher and Tamil scholar
 Venkatesh Iyer, Indian cricketer
 J. Jayalalithaa, Indian politician (Former Chief Minister of Tamil Nadu), actress
 Kasthuri, Indian actress
 K. S. Krishnan, Indian physicist, co-discoverer of the Raman scattering
 Ramya Krishnan, Indian actress
 Trisha Krishnan, Indian actress
 Padma Lakshmi, Indian American author, activist, model, and television host
 Iravatham Mahadevan, Indian epigraphist and civil servant
 Shankar Mahadevan, Indian Singer and Composer
 R. Madhavan, Indian actor
 Ramana Maharshi, Indian sage
 Hema Malini, Indian actress
 Crazy Mohan, Indian actor
 Vennira Aadai Moorthy, Indian actor
 T. S. B. K. Moulee, Indian actor
 Nachinarkiniyar, medieval Tamil scholar and commentator of the Tolkāppiyam, Pattuppāṭṭu, Kaliththokai, Kuṟuntokai and Civaka Cintamani
 Indra Nooyi, Former CEO of PepsiCo 
 Paridhiyaar, medieval Tamil scholar and Kural commentator
 Parimelalhagar, medieval Tamil scholar and Kural commentator
Sundar Pichai, CEO of Alphabet Inc.
 C. Rajagopalachari, Indian statesman, politician, Indian independence activist, last Governor-General of India, Former Chief Minister of Madras State
 Venki Ramakrishnan, Nobel Prize-winning Indian structural biologist
 C. V. Raman, Nobel Prize-winning Indian physicist
 Srinivasa Ramanujan, Indian mathematician
 Cho Ramaswamy, Indian actor
 Alladi Ramakrishnan, Indian physicist and founder of the Institute of Mathematical Sciences (Matscience) in Chennai
 Ramaiyan, commander in the Madurai Nayak dynasty
 Krishnan Raman, commander-in-chief of the Chola forces under Rajaraja Chola I, holding the title Mummadi Brahmarayar Niyomanam
 Sivananda Saraswati, Indian yoga guru, Hindu spiritual teacher, and proponent of Vedanta
 C. S. Seshadri, mathematician.
 Nirmala Sitharaman - Current Finance Minister of India, Bharatiya Janata party.
 Krishnamachari Srikkanth, Indian cricketer
 S. Srinivasan, Indian aeronautical engineer
 Padma Subrahmanyam, Indian classical Bharatanatyam dancer
 Subramanian Swamy, Indian politician, economist and statistician
 Tolkappiyar, earliest known author and grammarian in Tamil language
 Vaali, Indian poet and lyricist
 S. R. Srinivasa Varadhan, Indian mathematician and Abel Prize laureate
 Vyjayanthimala, Indian actress

See also

Caste system in India
Gotra
Vedic priesthood
List of Brahmins
List of Iyengars

References

Brahmin communities
Tamil Brahmins
Brahmin communities across India
Social groups of Tamil Nadu